Niju Ram  (died 25 December 2019) was an Indian politician from Himachal Pradesh belonging to Bharatiya Janata Party. He was a legislator of the Himachal Pradesh Legislative Assembly.

Biography
Ram was elected as a legislator of the Himachal Pradesh Legislative Assembly from Rampur in 1977 as a Janata Party candidate. Later, he joined Bharatiya Janata Party.

Ram died on 25 December 2019.

References

2019 deaths
Bharatiya Janata Party politicians from Himachal Pradesh
Himachal Pradesh MLAs 1977–1982
People from Shimla district
Place of death missing
Place of birth missing
Year of birth missing